Sobralia decora, commonly known as the beautiful sobralia, is a species of orchid. It is pink-lavender and is found from Mexico through Central America. It is kept by orchid fanciers.

Note on species name and synonyms 
There has been a lot of confusion and dubious determinations of this species in the 19th century, see the text in: 
Curtis's botanical magazine   vol. 120 (ser. 3 no. 50) tab. 7376: (http://www.botanicus.org/page/453767)Biologia Centrali-Americana :zoology, botany and archaeology /edited by Frederick Ducane Godman and Osbert Salvin'', vol. 3 page 295. (http://www.botanicus.org/page/598626)

References

External links 
 The Sobralia pages, S. decora

decora
Orchids of Central America
Orchids of Belize
Orchids of Costa Rica
Orchids of Mexico